Kevin Joseph Witt (born January 5, 1976) is an American former professional baseball player. Witt spent parts of five seasons in the major leagues, appearing with the Blue Jays, San Diego Padres, Detroit Tigers and Tampa Bay Devil Rays, most often as a designated hitter. He also played parts of two seasons in Japan, spending time with the Yokohama BayStars and Tohoku Rakuten Golden Eagles.

Early life
Witt was born in High Point, North Carolina, to Daniel Melvin Witt and his wife, Jean Marie Mechlinski Witt. He has two older brothers, Daniel Melvin Witt, Jr. and David Michael Witt. He attended Bishop Kenny High School in Jacksonville, Florida.

Career
Witt was drafted in the first round, 28th overall, by the Toronto Blue Jays in the 1994 Major League Baseball Draft. Originally a shortstop, Witt was converted to first base while in the minors. He made his major league debut with the Blue Jays as a September call-up in 1998, collecting one hit in seven at-bats. In 1999, he collected seven hits in 34 at-bats, good for only a .206 batting average. He also hit his first Major League home run. He spent 2000 in the minors with the Syracuse SkyChiefs (AAA). He was granted free agency on October 15, 2000.

On December 22, 2000, he signed with the San Diego Padres. In limited playing time in 2001, Witt hit .185, with two home runs and five runs batted in. On October 6, 2001, Witt pinch-ran for Tony Gwynn, who had recorded his final Major League hit with a double. He was granted free agency on October 15, 2001.

On November 15, 2001, he signed with the Cincinnati Reds. He spent the entire season in the minors with the Louisville Bats(AAA), then was granted free agency on October 15, 2002.

On February 3, 2003, he signed with the Tigers. His only significant playing time came with the Tigers in 2003, when he batted .263 in 93 games while splitting his time between designated hitter, first base, and left field. He also hit 10 home runs and drove in 26 runs, while also stealing his first and only career base. He was granted free agency on October 15, 2003.

On November 19, 2003, he signed with the St. Louis Cardinals. He spent the entire season in the minors with the Memphis Redbirds. He was granted free agency on October 15, 2004.

After spending the 2004 season back in the minor leagues, Witt signed with the BayStars in 2005. He returned to North America the next season, and earned International League Most Valuable Player honors after leading all of minor league baseball with 36 home runs, while setting a Triple-A Durham Bulls franchise record and a Rays' organization record. That earned him one last major league stint, where he batted .148 in 19 games for the Devil Rays. He returned to Japan in 2007 for Rakuten, but hit just .174 in 40 games in what turned out to be his final professional season.

As Coach
Witt has spent most of his coaching career in the Miami Marlins organization. He was named as the hitting coach for the New Orleans Baby Cakes (Marlins' AAA) for the 2017 season, the hitting coach for the Jacksonville Jumbo Shrimp (Marlins' AA) for the 2018 season, and the hitting coach for the Jupiter Hammerheads (Marlins' High A) for the 2019 season.

Personal life
Witt and his wife Lori (nee Long) live in Texas and have four sons: Tanner, Preston, Cullen and Ripken, and a daughter, Skyler. Tanner was an MLB Draft prospect in 2020, but after not being selected in the slimmed-down five round draft, decided he will go on and play for the Texas Longhorns baseball squad. Preston began his playing career at Southwestern University.

Sources

External links

Pelota Binaria (Venezuelan Winter League)

1976 births
Living people
American expatriate baseball players in Canada
American expatriate baseball players in Japan
Baseball coaches from North Carolina
Baseball players from North Carolina
Baseball coaches from Florida
Baseball players from Jacksonville, Florida
Bishop Kenny High School alumni
Cardenales de Lara players
American expatriate baseball players in Venezuela
Detroit Tigers players
Dunedin Blue Jays players
Durham Bulls players
Hagerstown Suns players
International League MVP award winners
Knoxville Smokies players
Louisville Bats players
Major League Baseball designated hitters
Major League Baseball first basemen
Medicine Hat Blue Jays players
Memphis Redbirds players
People from High Point, North Carolina
Portland Beavers players
San Diego Padres players
Syracuse SkyChiefs players
Tampa Bay Devil Rays players
Tohoku Rakuten Golden Eagles players
Toledo Mud Hens players
Toronto Blue Jays players
Yokohama BayStars players